The Black Economic Alliance (BEA) is a United States nonprofit, nonpartisan organization of Black business leaders and allies established in 2018. While not formally aligned with either the Democratic or Republican political party, its initial slate of endorsements were for Democratic candidates.

Leadership

BEA was founded by a group of Black business leaders including Charles Phillips; Tony Coles, head of the biotech firm Cerevel Therapeutics; Marva Smalls at Viacom; and William M. Lewis Jr.  The BEA board of directors is co-chaired by Tony Coles and Charles Phillips, and includes Tia Breakley, Robyn Coles, Richelieu Dennis, Broderick Johnson, Maddie McFadden-Lawson, Vicki Palmer, former Governor Deval Patrick, and Kneeland Youngblood. The organization's advisory board includes Gerald Adolph, Troy Carter, William Cohen, Caretha Coleman, Morgan DeBaun, Bruce Gordon, Carla Harris, Jon Henes, Van Jones, Ronald Kirk, Carol Sutton Lewis, Edward Lewis, Chris Lyons, Sheila Marcelo, Brian Mathis, Heather McGee, Lisa Opoku, Spencer Overton, Richard Parsons, Karen Phillips, Robert Raben, John W. Rogers, Jr., Robert E. Rubin, Steve Schmidt, Bakari Sellers, Marva Smalls, Michael Steele, Fred Terrell, Natalie Tran, and Benaree P. Wiley.

Akunna Cook served as the founding executive director of the Black Economic Alliance from March 2018 through September 2019. In March 2020, the board of directors appointed David Clunie as executive director of the group. In August 2021, Samantha Tweedy was appointed president of the Black Economic Alliance Foundation.

See also
 Black-owned businesses

References

External links
 

Black economic empowerment
United States political action committees